Chennan Subdistrict is a subdistrict and the seat of Daxiang District in Shaoyang prefecture-level City, Hunan, China. It had 18 villages and 12 communities under its jurisdiction in 2015, its seat is Mati Community.

References

Daxiang District
Subdistricts of Hunan